Orazio Marinali (1643–1720) was an Italian late-Baroque sculptor, active mainly in the Veneto or Venetian mainland.

He trained with Josse de Corte. He is best known for over 150 statues produced by him and his studio for the estate and gardens of a single villa in Vicenza, the Villa Lampertico (also known as Villa Conti or La Deliziosa). Many are stock characters from commedia dell'arte theater; others depict  the so-called bravi (desperadoes). They vary in quality, and are often executed in local stone. For the same villa garden, Marinali also completed a large fountain group: la Ruota, symbolizing the four corners of the world.

Many of Marinali's garden statues from the Vicenza area were removed to the Villa La Pietra outside Florence in the 20th century, to decorate gardens created there by Arthur Acton. They stand there alongside statues by the Paduan sculptor Antonio Bonazza who was influenced by Marinali.

Among his pupils were Domenico Aglio and Lorenzo Mattielli, who married the daughter of Angelo Marineli, Orazio's brother and collaborator.

Sources

1643 births
1720 deaths
17th-century Italian sculptors
Italian male sculptors
18th-century Italian sculptors
18th-century Italian male artists